The  was the sole line operated by the Kashima Railway Company in Ibaraki Prefecture, Japan. It operated between Ishioka Station and Hokota Station. It closed on 31 March 2007.

Stations
The line had 17 stations as shown below. As of 2002, only two stations, Ishioka and Hitachi-Ogawa, were staffed.

History
The line first opened on 8 June 1924 as the steam-operated , using steam operation between Ishioka and Hitachi-Ogawa. The full line to Hokota was opened on 16 May 1929.

Diesel operation commenced on 6 September 1930.

From 1 June 1965, the railway became the Kantō Railway Hokota Line, and from 1 April 1979, it became the separate Kashima Railway.

Freight operations ceased in 2002.

In 2006, the company announced the planned closure of the line, and the line finally closed on 31 March 2007.

The section between Ishioka and Shikamura stations was replaced with a BRT on August 2010.

References

 
Railway lines opened in 1924
Railway lines closed in 2007
1067 mm gauge railways in Japan